Bernard Alfred Quaritch (13 January 1871 – 27 August 1913) was the son of antiquarian book dealer Bernard Quaritch, and continued his father's business in London until his own death in Brighton on 27 August 1913.

According to journalist and book collector Bernard Falk (1882-1960),

The business survives to this day.

References

English booksellers
Burials at Highgate Cemetery
1871 births
1913 deaths
19th-century English businesspeople